Sabir Shirbalayevich Khamzin (born 20 December 1972) is a retired Russian professional footballer.

Honours
 Latvian Higher League bronze: 1998.

External links
 Profile at playerhistory.com

1972 births
People from Shchyolkovsky District
Living people
Russian footballers
Russian Premier League players
Russian expatriate footballers
Expatriate footballers in Latvia
Expatriate footballers in Bangladesh
Expatriate footballers in France
FC Tyumen players
FK Ventspils players
FC Khimki players
FC Asmaral Moscow players
Stade Brestois 29 players
Russian expatriate sportspeople in Latvia
Russian expatriate sportspeople in Bangladesh
FC Vityaz Podolsk players
Association football forwards
FC FShM Torpedo Moscow players
FC Sportakademklub Moscow players
Sportspeople from Moscow Oblast